An Arabian Tragedy is a 1912 American silent film produced by Kalem Company and distributed by General Film Company. It was directed by Sidney Olcott with Gene Gauntier, Robert Vignola and Alice Hollister in the leading roles.

Plot 
Ayub Kashif becomes embittered toward his wife, Fatima, because she's childless. He eventually decides to divorce Fatima and free her slave, Hanfi, whom he then plans to marry. Fatima, who still loves her husband, lives a life of sorrow, praying that her husband's love will return to her. A year later, Allah grants Ayub an heir. Fatima hearing of the event, writes Ayub, requesting that she be allowed to attend his wife as a slave, which Ayub denies. Four years later, Ayub, with a number of other merchants, departs to take rich merchandise across the desert. While on the journey he falls critically ill and, according to Turkish custom, is left to die. Fatima, in her dreams, sees that her husband is about to perish. Haunted by the vision, she begs his new wife to send aid to Ayub. Hanfi, caring only for her personal comfort, laughs at her. Fatima, accompanied by two slaves, starts searching for Ayub. After crossing the desert, Fatima finds him digging his own grave and, with a prayer that he be forgiven, Ayub dies in her arms.

Cast
 Gene Gauntier - Lucasha / Ayub's 1st Wife
 Robert Vignola - Ayub Kashif
 Alice Hollister as Hanfi (Slave Girl) / Ayub's 2nd Wife
George Hollister, Jr. as Kafur
J.P. Gowan as Undetermined Second Role

Production notes
The film was shot in Luxor, Egypt.

References

External links

 An Arabian Tragedy website dedicated to Sidney Olcott

1912 films
Silent American drama films
American silent short films
American black-and-white films
Films set in Egypt
Films shot in Egypt
Films directed by Sidney Olcott
1912 short films
1912 drama films
1910s American films